Theodore "Teddy" Pilette (born 26 July 1942, in Brussels) is a former racing driver from Belgium. He participated in 4 Formula One World Championship Grands Prix, the first on 12 May 1974 with Bernie Ecclestone's Brabham team.

Son of André Pilette and grandson of Théodore Pilette, he followed the family path. He started his career by winning many go-kart races before being sent to England to the talent-spotting Jim Russell Racing School. This experience created the opportunity for him to be part of the cast for John Frankenheimer's movie Grand Prix, and later on Le Mans with Steve McQueen.

On the circuit, Pilette raced for Carlo Abarth in 1963 and 1965, and in 1967 he started racing for the Belgian VDS team. He won the European Formula 5000 Championship in 1973 with a Chevron B24, and again in 1975 with a Lola T400. He also competed in the US in Formula 5000. He also made 3 attempts at the Indy 500. He attempted to qualify for the 1977 Indianapolis 500 but failed to make the field. He drove in the CART Championship Car race at Watkins Glen International in 1981 but retired after 14 laps due to gearbox failure. It would be his only Champ Car start as he failed to qualify for the 1982 Indianapolis 500 and 1983 Indianapolis 500 and was entered in the Cleveland Grand Prix later that year but the car was driven by Herm Johnson.

In 1977, Capparelli arranged for Pilette to drive with the dying BRM team in Formula One, and also in the Aurora AFX Formula One Championship the following year.

In sports cars Pilette won the Spa 24 Hours with a Ford Capri, in the last race on the long circuit in 1978.

In 1992 he formed the Pilette Speed Tradition Formula Ford team in Europe. In 1994 he built his own Formula Three car, the Pilette F.3, and raced in the German Formula 3 championship with Paolo Coloni.
In September 2013, he was elected Vice President of the Grand Prix Drivers Club (formerly known as Club International des Anciens Pilotes de Grand-Prix F1)

Racing record

Complete 24 Hours of Le Mans results

Complete European F5000 Championship results
(key) (Races in bold indicate pole position; races in italics indicate fastest lap.)

Complete Formula One World Championship results
(key)

Complete Formula One non-championship results
(key)

Complete British Formula One Championship results
(key) (Races in bold indicate pole position; races in italics indicate fastest lap.)

References

External links
 www.teddypilette.com

Belgian racing drivers
Belgian Formula One drivers
1942 births
Living people
24 Hours of Le Mans drivers
24 Hours of Spa drivers
Tasman Series drivers
Champ Car drivers
Brabham Formula One drivers
BRM Formula One drivers
World Sportscar Championship drivers
British Formula One Championship drivers
Racing drivers from Brussels
12 Hours of Reims drivers